Henry Webster may refer to:

 Henry Webster (cricketer) (1844–1915), English cricketer
 Henry Kitchell Webster (1875–1932), American author
 Henry S. Webster (1846–1910), American Civil War sailor and Medal of Honor recipient
 Henry Vassall Webster (1793–1847), British Army officer
 Harry Webster (Henry George Webster, 1917–2007), British automotive engineer
 Harry Webster (footballer) (1930–2008), English footballer